Zhang Yanquan (born June 13, 1994 in Chaozhou, Guangdong) is a Chinese diver of Hakka ancestry from Dabu, Guangdong. He competed at the 2012 Summer Olympics in the Men's synchronized 10 metre platform, winning the gold medal.

See also
China at the 2012 Summer Olympics

References

1994 births
Living people
Hakka people
Hakka sportspeople
Chinese male divers
Divers at the 2012 Summer Olympics
Olympic divers of China
Olympic gold medalists for China
Olympic medalists in diving
People from Chaozhou
Sportspeople from Guangdong
Medalists at the 2012 Summer Olympics
Asian Games medalists in diving
Divers at the 2014 Asian Games
World Aquatics Championships medalists in diving
Asian Games gold medalists for China
Medalists at the 2014 Asian Games
20th-century Chinese people
21st-century Chinese people